Highway 80 is a short East-West Highway in southern Jordan, built in the 1960s. It starts from Highway 15 and connects it to Aqaba, 13 km on the west where it ends on Highway 65.

See also
Itinerary of the highway on Google maps

References

Roads in Jordan